Brooking Township is an inactive township in Jackson County, in the U.S. state of Missouri.

Brooking Township was established in 1872, taking its name from Alvin Brooking, a state legislator.

The township includes Raytown and environs, including a northwestern portion of Unity Village.

References

Townships in Missouri
Townships in Jackson County, Missouri